The Union of South Africa competed at the 1924 Summer Olympics in Paris, France. 30 competitors, all men, took part in 25 events in 7 sports.

Medalists

Athletics

Twelve athletes represented South Africa in 1924. It was the nation's fifth appearance in the sport as well as the Games. It was the first time since 1904 that South Africa failed to win a single gold medal in the sport, though the team did have two medal-winning athletes (Atkinson won silver in the short hurdles and McMaster took bronze in the racewalk).

Ranks given are within the heat.

Boxing 

Four boxers represented South Africa at the 1924 Games. It was the nation's second appearance in the sport. Smith took the gold in the bantamweight (a championship won four years earlier by countryman Clarence Walker). Ingram and Beland were beaten in the quarterfinals, while Eustice lost his first-round match.

Cycling

A single cyclist represented South Africa in 1924. It was the nation's fourth appearance in the sport. Kaltenbrunn, who had won the silver medal in the individual time trial in 1920, finished fifth in this competition. He also competed in the 50 kilometres on the track, but was not among the top seven whose places were recorded.

Road cycling

Track cycling

Ranks given are within the heat.

Sailing

A single sailor represented South Africa in 1924. It was the nation's debut in the sport.

Shooting

Seven sport shooters represented South Africa in 1924.

Tennis

 Men

References

External links
Official Olympic Reports
International Olympic Committee results database

Nations at the 1924 Summer Olympics
1924
1924 in South African sport